Summer (Spanish - El verano) or The Threshing Floor (Spanish - La era) is the largest cartoon painted by Francisco de Goya as a tapestry design for Spain's Royal Tapestry Factory. Painted from 1786 to 1787, it was part of his fifth series, dedicated to traditional themes and intended for the heir to the Spanish throne and his wife (the Prince and Princess of Asturias). The tapestries were to hang in the couple's dining room at the Pardo Palace.

The cartoon is now in the Museo del Prado in Madrid, whilst a smaller sketch for the work known as The Threshing Floor is in the Lázaro Galdiano Museum.

Context of the work 
All the paintings of the fifth series are intended for the dining room of the Prince of Asturias, that is to say of the one who was to become Charles IV and his wife Marie Louise of Parma, in the Pardo Palace. The painting was painted in the fall of 1786.

It was considered lost until 1869, when the canvas was discovered in the basement of the Royal Palace of Madrid by Gregorio Cruzada Villaamil, and was returned to the Prado Museum in 1870 by orders of January 19 and February 9, 1870, where it is exhibited in room 943. The canvas is mentioned for the first time in the catalog of the Prado Museum in 1876.

See also
List of works by Francisco Goya

References

External links

Paintings by Francisco Goya in the Museo del Prado
1787 paintings
Tapestry cartoons